The Middlewich Paddies are an Irish folk band formed in 1979 in the town of Middlewich in Cheshire. Although not widely known outside of folk music circles, two members of the band were instrumental in setting up the Middlewich folk and boat festival which has now become a recognised festival on the folk circuit.

Members
 Michael Woodbine - Tin Whistle, lead, founding member
 Richard Devaney - Vocalist
 Dave Thompson - guitar, Mouth Truss and vocals
 Graham Sivills - mandolin, guitar, whistle and vocals

Discography

Albums
 The Best of the Middlewich Paddies, 1990
 Mann Alive, 1992

External links
 Middlewich Paddies home page
 Graham Sivills home page for the Middlewich Paddies

Irish folk musical groups
Middlewich
Musical groups established in 1979
Musical groups from Cheshire